The Darwish Pasha Mosque (transliteration: Jami Darwish Pasha) is a 16th-century mosque in Damascus, Syria. The mosque was erected in 1574 by the Ottoman governor of Damascus Darwish Pasha.

References

Bibliography

Religious buildings and structures completed in 1574
Mosques in Damascus
Ottoman mosques in Syria
Ottoman architecture in Damascus
1570s in Ottoman Syria
16th-century establishments in Ottoman Syria
16th-century mosques